This is a list of investigational sex-hormonal agents, or sex-hormonal agents that are currently under development for clinical use but are not yet approved. Chemical/generic names are listed first, with developmental code names, synonyms, and brand names in parentheses.

Androgenics

Androgen receptor agonists
 EC586 – oral prodrug of testosterone (androgen/anabolic steroid) with improved pharmacokinetics

Androgen receptor antagonists
 Bavdegalutamide (AVR-110) – androgen receptor antagonist for prostate cancer
 Clascoterone (CB-03-01, Breezula, Winlevi) – androgen receptor antagonist for topical treatment of scalp hair loss 
 Deutenzalutamide (deuterated enzalutamide; HC-1119) – androgen receptor antagonist for prostate cancer   
 Pruxelutamide (GT-0918; proxalutamide) – androgen receptor antagonist for prostate cancer 
 Pyrilutamide (KX-826) – androgen receptor antagonist for topical treatment of androgen-dependent scalp hair loss and acne
 Spironolactone (Aldactone) – androgen receptor antagonist for systemic treatment of acne

Atypical androgen receptor antagonists
 Dimethylcurcumin (ASC-J9) – androgen receptor degradation enhancer for topical acne treatment 
 EPI-7386 – N-terminal domain androgen receptor antagonist for prostate cancer   [https://www.prnewswire.com/news-releases/essa-pharma-announces-nomination-of-epi-7386-as-lead-clinical-candidate-in-metastatic-castration-resistant-prostate-cancer-300820449.html

Androgen synthesis inhibitors
 Seviteronel (VT-464) – CYP17A1 inhibitor (androgen synthesis inhibitor) for prostate cancer and breast cancer

Estrogenics

Estrogen receptor agonists
 EC508 – oral prodrug of estradiol (estrogen) with improved pharmacokinetics
 Erteberel (LY-500307, SERBA-1) – selective ERβ agonist for schizophrenia 
 Estetrol (Donesta) – estrogen for menopausal symptoms and other indications

Selective estrogen receptor modulators
 Acolbifene (EM-652, SCH-57068) – selective estrogen receptor modulator for breast cancer 
 Afimoxifene (4-hydroxytamoxifen; 4-OHT; TamoGel) – selective estrogen receptor modulator for topical treatment of breast cancer and hyperplasia 
 Amcenestrant (SAR-439859; SERD '859) – selective estrogen receptor modulator and selective estrogen receptor degrader for breast cancer 
 Camizestrant (AZ14066724, AZD-9833) – selective estrogen receptor modulator and selective estrogen receptor degrader for breast cancer 
 Endoxifen (4-hydroxy-N-desmethyltamoxifen) – selective estrogen receptor modulator for breast cancer 
 Giredestrant (GDC-9545; RG-6171) – selective estrogen receptor modulator and selective estrogen receptor degrader for breast cancer 
 Imlunestrant (LY-3484356) – selective estrogen receptor modulator and selective estrogen receptor degrader for breast cancer and endometrial cancer 
 Rintodestrant (G1T-48) – selective estrogen receptor modulator and selective estrogen receptor degrader for breast cancer

Estrogen receptor antagonists
 Fulvestrant-3 boronic acid (ZB716) – estrogen receptor antagonist (antiestrogen) for breast cancer

Estrogen synthesis inhibitors
 Estradiol sulfamate (E2MATE, J995, PGL-2, PGL-2001, ZK-190628) – steroid sulfatase inhibitor (estrogen "activation" inhibitor) for endometriosis 
 Leflutrozole (BGS-649) – aromatase inhibitor (estrogen synthesis inhibitor) for male hypogonadism

Progestogenics

Progesterone receptor agonists
 Hydroxyprogesterone caproate (LPCN-1107) – oral progesterone receptor agonist (progestogen/progestin) for prevention of preterm labor
 VOLT-02 – water-soluble conjugate of progesterone and neurosteroid for traumatic brain injury and gynecological disorders

Selective progesterone receptor modulators
 Telapristone (CDB-4124, Proellex, Proellex-V, Progenta) – selective progesterone receptor modulator for breast cancer, endometriosis, and uterine fibroids 
 Vilaprisan (BAY-1002670) – selective progesterone receptor modulator for endometriosis and uterine fibroids

Progesterone receptor antagonists
 Onapristone (AR-18, IVV-1001, ZK-299, ZK-98299) – progesterone receptor antagonist (antiprogestogen) for prostate cancer

GnRH/gonadotropins

Kisspeptin receptor agonists
 MVT-602 (RVT-602, TAK-448) – small-molecule kisspeptin receptor agonist for female infertility and hypogonadism

Neurokinin/tachykinin receptor antagonists
 Elinzanetant (BAY-3427080; GSK-1144814; NT-814) – small-molecule NK1 receptor and NK3 receptor antagonist for hot flashes and "sex hormone disorders"
 Fezolinetant (ESN-364) – small-molecule NK3 receptor antagonist for hot flashes, polycystic ovary syndrome, and uterine fibroids

Mixed/combinations

Androgen and progesterone receptor modulators
 11β-Methyl-19-nortestosterone dodecylcarbonate (CDB-4754) – dual androgen/anabolic steroid and progestin for use as a male birth control pill
 Dimethandrolone undecanoate (CDB-4521) – dual androgen/anabolic steroid and progestin for use as a male birth control pill

Androgen and estrogen receptor modulators
 Acolbifene/prasterone (Femivia) – selective estrogen receptor modulator and dehydroepiandrosterone supplement for hot flashes

Androgen, estrogen, and progesterone receptor modulators
 Ethinylestradiol/drospirenone/prasterone – estrogen, progestogen, and dehydroepiandrosterone combination for female birth control

See also
 List of investigational drugs

References

External links
 AdisInsight - Springer
 2011 Medicines in Development for Women - PhRMA

Sex-hormonal agents, investigational
Experimental drugs
Hormonal agents